Catalan Workers' Left (in Catalan: Esquerra Catalana dels Treballadors) was a political party in Northern Catalonia, France. ECT was formed in 1972, with its main base in Perpignan.

ECT was linked to the Socialist Party of National Liberation (PSAN). In 1977 a group, linked to the Socialist Party of National Liberation - Provisional (PSAN-p), broke away from ECT and formed the Socialist Organisation of National Liberation (OSAN).

The newspaper of the organization was La Nova Falç.

ECT was dissolved in 1981, but many of its cadres continued to work in other political outfits, like Catalan Unity (UC).

References

Sastre, Carles. Terra lliure, punt de partida: 1979-1995, una biografía autoritzada. Edicions del 1979, 2012, p. 34. .

External links
ECT documents

1972 establishments in France
1981 disestablishments in France
Catalan nationalist parties
Defunct Maoist parties
Defunct political parties in France
Defunct socialist parties in Europe
Left-wing nationalist parties
Maoist organizations in France
Nationalist parties in France
Political parties disestablished in 1981
Political parties established in 1972
Political parties in Northern Catalonia
Socialist parties in France